Shalika Karunanayake (born 14 February 1987) is a Sri Lankan first-class cricketer who plays for Sri Lanka Army Sports Club.

References

External links
 

1987 births
Living people
Sri Lankan cricketers
Sri Lanka Army Sports Club cricketers
Sportspeople from Kurunegala
Ruhuna Royals cricketers
Galle Guardians cricketers
Galle District cricketers